Hartman is a ghost town in Bowie County, Texas, United States.

History
In its brief history, Hartman had only a church and a sawmill in the 1930s then disappeared in 1984.

Geography

Education
Hartman had its own school in the 1930s. Today, the ghost town is located within the Liberty-Eylau Independent School District.

References

Ghost towns in Texas